Ələkli, old name: Əlikli (also, Alakli and Alyaklu) is a village and municipality in the Sharur District of Nakhchivan Autonomous Republic, Azerbaijan. It is located 7 km in the south-east from the district center, on the left bank of the Arpachay River. Its population is mainly busy with farming. There are secondary school, club and a medical center in the village. It has a population of 1,284.

References 

Populated places in Sharur District